The Ganbatte Trophy was a silver cup presented to the winner of any rugby union match between the Melbourne Rebels team from Australia and the Sunwolves team from Japan. The word Ganbatte ("Do your best") is often used as an exhortation at Japanese sporting events meaning to "Go for it!" or to strive.

History
The Melbourne Rebels recruited Japanese international players Shota Horie in 2013, followed by Keita Inagaki, Male Sau, and Kotaro Matsushima. The club was the first in Australia to launch a website in the Japanese language. In 2016, following the introduction of the Sunwolves team to the Super Rugby competition, the Ganbatte Trophy was inaugurated to mark the relationship between the Rebels and Japanese rugby. The Rebels won the trophy on 5 of the 6 occasions the trophy was contested, with the Sunwolves solitary win coming in February 2020. The 7th and final contesting of the trophy scheduled for March 2020 was cancelled due to the COVID-19 pandemic, with the Sunwolves being disbanded in June 2020 following the cancellation of the 2020 Super Rugby season.

Winners

 2016 Rebels
 2018 Rebels
 2018 Rebels
 2019 Rebels
 2019 Rebels
 2020 Sunwolves

Fixtures

See also

 Super Rugby
 Melbourne Rebels
 Sunwolves
 Rugby union trophies and awards

References

External links
Official Website of Melbourne Rebels
Official Website of Sunwolves
Photo of the Ganbette Trophy from twitter.com

2016 establishments in Australia
2016 establishments in Japan
Melbourne Rebels
Sunwolves